Eduardo “Bèto” Adriana (29 July 1925 – 10 April 1997) was a sportsman who represented the Netherlands Antilles at the Olympics. At the 1960 Summer Olympics he competed in the weightlifting competition and at the 1972 Summer Olympics he competed in the sports shooting.

In weightlifting, he won three bronze medals at the Pan American Games from 1955 to 1963. He also finished fifth in the shot put competition at the 1955 Pan American Games.

References

External links
 

1925 births
1997 deaths
Dutch Antillean male sport shooters
Dutch Antillean male weightlifters
Competitors at the 1946 Central American and Caribbean Games
Competitors at the 1950 Central American and Caribbean Games
Competitors at the 1954 Central American and Caribbean Games
Competitors at the 1959 Central American and Caribbean Games
Central American and Caribbean Games gold medalists for the Netherlands Antilles
Central American and Caribbean Games silver medalists for the Netherlands Antilles
Athletes (track and field) at the 1955 Pan American Games
Weightlifters at the 1955 Pan American Games
Weightlifters at the 1959 Pan American Games
Weightlifters at the 1963 Pan American Games
Pan American Games bronze medalists for the Netherlands Antilles
Pan American Games medalists in weightlifting
Olympic shooters of the Netherlands Antilles
Olympic weightlifters of the Netherlands Antilles
Weightlifters at the 1960 Summer Olympics
Shooters at the 1972 Summer Olympics
Curaçao sportspeople
People from Willemstad
Dutch Antillean shot putters
Dutch Antillean male athletes
Male shot putters
Central American and Caribbean Games medalists in athletics
Medalists at the 1955 Pan American Games
Medalists at the 1959 Pan American Games
Medalists at the 1963 Pan American Games